Zee Kannada is an Indian Kannada pay television GEC that was launched in the year 2006 and owned by Zee Entertainment Enterprises. It is also being as the first mainstream satellite channel in Kannada.

History
Zee Kannada was launched in 2006 as ZEE's second South Indian language channel after its Telugu venture, which launched in May 2005.

On 2014, Zee Kannada light blue logo has given way to brighter red and blue.

On 15th October 2017, coinciding Zee Network's Silver Jubliee, along with all Zee Channels, Zee Kannada's logo has rechristened to circle logo. 

On 2018, a new brand identity and launched the HD Channel with HD visuals and Dolby Digital Plus sound quality. The unveil and launch took place in a grand ceremony at the Zee Kannada Kutumba Awards 2018.

ZEEL launched the digital news channel as Zee Kannada News in January 2022.

Programming

Sibling channel
Zee Entertainment Enterprises launched Zee Kannada's sister channel Zee Picchar on 1 March 2020, which airs non-stop Sandalwood films.

Reception
From its launch to still, Zee Kannada is consistently remains the No. 1 channel in Karnataka and one of the Top Rated Indian television channel by its programmes such as drama, reality shows and films. The shows like Puttakkana Makkalu, Gattimela, Hitler Kalyana, Jothe Jotheyalli and reality shows like Jodi No.1 were been Leading the TRP Charts. other reality shows like Drama juniors,Comedy kiladigalu,Sa Re Ga Ma Pa also scores well on the TRP charts.

Award functions

Hemmeya Kannadiga
Hemmeya Kannadiga is given to the people who made Karnataka proud at different occupation like Film Industry, Social Service, Sports.

Zee Kutumba Awards
Renowned Zee Kannada television personalities are felicitated for their on-screen work and achievements for their shows. Zee honoring fiction stars and shows by nominating and presenting awards to them.

Zee Comedy Awards
The comedy artists of Sandalwood and Stage artists are honoured by presenting awards to them.

References

External links
Zee Kannada on ZEE5
Zee Kannada on YouTube

Television stations in Bangalore
Kannada-language television channels
Zee Entertainment Enterprises
Television channels and stations established in 2006
2006 establishments in Karnataka